Lingnan Normal University (LNU; formerly Zhanjiang Normal University (ZNU) is an institution of higher learning in the Chikan District of Zhanjiang City, Guangdong Province, China.

History 
The history of the university dates back to the "Leiyang Academy" founded in 1636. In 1904, it started its education training program. In 1978, it became Leizhou Normal College, and was elevated to Zhanjiang Normal University in 1991. Zhanjiang Normal University changed its name to Lingnan Normal University in 2014.

See also 
List of universities and colleges in Guangdong
List of universities in China

External links 
Lingnan Normal University - Alternate URL
Lingnan Normal University 
 
cpc.people.com.cn(in Chinese)
www.moe.gov.cn (in Chinese)

Teachers colleges in China
Universities and colleges in Zhanjiang
Educational institutions established in 1991
1991 establishments in China